Lake Henry is a natural lake in South Dakota, in the United States.

Lake Henry takes its name from Henry, South Dakota, which was named for J. E. Henry, an early settler.

See also
List of lakes in South Dakota

References

Lakes of South Dakota
Lakes of Codington County, South Dakota